The Dominican Republic Taekwondo Federation, is the governing body for the sport of taekwondo in the Dominican Republic.

History
On 13 September 1981 the Federation was founded in order to group all the local associations within the Dominican Republic.

Structure
The Dominican Republic Taekwondo Federation is affiliated to the Pan American Taekwondo Union (PATU) and World Taekwondo and is recognised by the Dominican Republic Olympic Committee (COLIMDO).

References

External links
 

Sports organizations established in 1981
Taekwondo
Taekwondo in the Dominican Republic
National members of World Taekwondo
National Taekwondo teams